Soul Food is the debut album from American rap group Goodie Mob, released by LaFace Records. Its title track was a hit single and the album included the first use of the term 'dirty south' (originated by Cool Breeze), on the track of the same name. The Goodie Mob quartet includes Cee-Lo Green, Big Gipp, Khujo, and T-Mo. Guest vocalists on this album include André 3000 and Big Boi of Outkast, Cool Breeze, and Witchdoctor. In 1996, it was certified gold as sales stand at over 500,000 units in the U.S.

The album is dedicated to the memory of Sheila J. Tyler-Calloway, Green's late mother. Soul Food received critical acclaim for its raw, Southern, socially conscious lyrics and original production from Organized Noize. Along with Outkast's Southernplayalisticadillacmuzik, Soul Food has been regarded as one of the two albums that brought southern hip hop to the mainstream, and it is regarded as a southern classic.

Track listing 
All tracks of the standard version of the album were produced by Organized Noize except "Fighting", which was produced by Mixzo and Organized Noize. Mr. DJ co-produced "Goodie Bag", although he was uncredited.

Standard Version

Sample credits
"Dirty South" contains samples of "Passacaglia in C Minor" performed by Hubert Laws.

Chart

Weekly charts

Year-end charts

Singles

Certifications

References 

1995 debut albums
Goodie Mob albums
Albums produced by Organized Noize
LaFace Records albums